Bures-sur-Yvette is one of the two RER B station of Bures-sur-Yvette, near Paris, in France.  This station is used to access University of Paris-Sud, and I H E S.

Réseau Express Régional stations
Railway stations in Essonne
Railway stations in France opened in 1891